George Graves may refer to:

 George Graves (actor) (1876–1949), English comic actor
 George Graves (biologist) (1784–1839), British naturalist's pocket-book author
 George S. Graves (1820–1902), American lawyer, businessman, and politician

See also
 Nadine George-Graves, American professor of theater and dance